is a Japanese snowboarder who has won multiple medals in international events, including consecutive golds in US Open Halfpipe in 2010 and 2011. He competed at the 2006 Turin Winter Olympics and 2010 Vancouver Winter Olympics, representing Japan.

Career
Kokubo showed great aptitude from age 11. He won multiple medals in international halfpipe and bigair events, including the silver in US Open Halfpipe at the age of 14.  He represented Japan in Turin Olympics and Vancouver Olympics, and had consecutive wins in US Open Halfpipe in 2010 and 2011. He mostly stays in the US in snowboarding seasons for competitions and video shooting sessions while mentoring and coaching aspiring young snowboarders including Ayumu Hirano, the 15-year-old silver medalist of 2014 winter Olympics from his home country, Japan. He is assigned as the official technical coach to the Japanese national snowboarding team since August 2013.

Style
His halfpipe boarding style is often described as clean and stylish with a unique combination of tricks.

Influence
Kokubo is known to be the mentor to Ayumu Hirano, a Japanese gold medalist in Halfpipe at 2022 Winter Olympics, since 2011. He was officially assigned as the technical coach to the Japanese snowboarding team for Sochi Winter Olympics, leading Ayumu Hirano and Taku Hiraoka to the Silver and Bronze medals respectively.

Victory devoted to earthquake/tsunami victims in Japan
Kokubo won his second US OPEN gold at the age of 22 in March 2011, right after his home country Japan was hit by a massive earthquake and following tsunami. In his winning interview, he confessed how he was saddened by the incident, and really hoped for good for his fellow country men : "I talked to my family and everybody is okay, but I have some friends I still haven't been able to contact." "I hope my win brings a little joy and happiness to Japan." 
In the following April, he released a press note from JEARS (Japan Earthquake Animal Rescue and Support) where he announced an offer of support to his country. He stated, "I was speechless, and for the first time since I was a kid, I sat and cried as we watched the news reports." "I knew immediately that I wanted to help my country and like so many people, I didn’t know how. My main focus was not on winning or the competition itself at that point, but just getting the day over with and being with my wife who was flying to California from Japan."

Controversy
Kokubo was criticized for his style of dress on February 9, 2010 after he was seen at the Narita International Airport wearing his Olympic team uniform with his shirt untucked, his trousers hanging low, and his tie loosened. Next day, when asked by the press, Kokubo said he was sorry about his dress, but the microphone caught Kokubo murmuring in a low voice "shut up". Subsequently, he was barred from the Olympic opening ceremony. This caused a controversy in Japan regarding whether an Olympian should represent the country not only in his/her athletic effort but also in cultural contexts.

References

External links
 
 
 
 
 Biography on NBC Olympics page

Japanese male snowboarders
Olympic snowboarders of Japan
Snowboarders at the 2006 Winter Olympics
Snowboarders at the 2010 Winter Olympics
Living people
1988 births
Sportspeople from Hokkaido
Asian Games medalists in snowboarding
Snowboarders at the 2007 Asian Winter Games
X Games athletes
Asian Games gold medalists for Japan
Medalists at the 2007 Asian Winter Games
Universiade medalists in snowboarding
Universiade gold medalists for Japan
Competitors at the 2009 Winter Universiade